The following churches are Roman Catholic Archdiocese of Galveston–Houston.

Austin County
 Guardian Angel Church (Wallis)
 Immaculate Conception Church (Industry)
 Immaculate Conception Church (Sealy)
 St. Mary Church (Frydek)
 Saints Peter and Paul Church (Bellville)

Brazoria County
 Most Holy Trinity Church (Angleton)
 Our Lady of Perpetual Help Church (Sweeny)
 Sacred Heart of Jesus Church (Iowa Colony, with a Manvel postal address) - It became a parish in 2013.
 St. Anthony de Padua Church (Danbury)
 Saints Cyril and Methodius Church (Damon)
 St. Helen Church (Pearland) - It was established in 1966. Its previous church building had a capacity of 900, it was building a new sanctuary, with a capacity of 15,000 and a cost of $7 million. The expansion plans also added parking spaces and installed a bridal facility. The sanctuary construction was to begin fall 2002 and parking construction was to begin summer 2002. In 2002 4,000 families were members, and in 2016 this had increased to 6,000, making it the largest Catholic church in Brazoria County. The property includes a K-8 school, St. Helen Catholic School.
 St. Jerome Church (Clute)
 St. John the Apostle Mission (West Columbia)
 St. John the Baptist Church (Alvin)
 St. Joseph on the Brazos Church (Brazoria)
 St. Mary Star of the Sea, Freeport, Texas
 St. Michael Church (Lake Jackson)

There is another parish with property in Pearland, but this building is in Harris County.

Fort Bend County
 Holy Family Church (Missouri City)
 Holy Rosary Church (Rosenberg)
 Our Lady of Guadalupe Church (Rosenberg)
 Sacred Heart Church (Richmond)
 St. Angela Merici Church (Missouri City)
 St. Faustina Catholic Church (Fulshear) - It is in proximity to Cinco Ranch and is popular with Greater Katy's Venezuelan population. St. Faustina was established in 2014 to relieve Epiphany of the Lord, Guardian Angel, Holy Rosary of Rosenberg, Sacred Heart, and St. Bartholomew as suburban growth had increased the number of area residents. Initially, masses were held in Joe Hubenak Elementary School, a Lamar Consolidated Independent School District facility. In 2017 it moved into its current building.
 St. John Fisher Church (unincorporated area next to Richmond)
 St. Laurence Church (Sugar Land) - Its sanctuary had its dedication ceremony in 1992. By 2006 St. Laurence had 4,600 families on its rolls and was oversubscribed. Its service area included Sienna Plantation.
 St. Mark the Evangelist Church (Fort Bend Houston, Houston)
 St. Michael Church (Needville)
 St. Theresa Church (Sugar Land) - The Imperial Sugar Company donated the land for the church, which opened in 1924. In 1955 the Basilian Fathers began serving as employees. In 2006 it was finalizing expansion plans, which originated from a 2005 survey.
 St. Thomas Aquinas Church (Sugar Land)
 St. Wenceslaus Mission (Beasley)

Galveston County
 Holy Family Parish (multiple locations) - The parish was established on August 15, 2009, as a merger of nine existing parishes. In 2010 the archdiocese classified it as "mid-sized" due to it having 2,600 households in its congregation. The congregation's number of church services per weekend was ten; KTRK-TV stated that this number of services "exceeds norms for a parish of its size." In 2010 it had six deacons and four priests.
 In Galveston: Holy Rosary Church, Sacred Heart Church, St. Mary Cathedral Basilica, and St. Patrick Church.
 Holy Rosary was Texas's first Catholic church for black people. Worship services began in 1886, while it used a building for its affiliated Catholic school, and in 1889 the parish was formally established. In 2009 the archdiocese announced that the Holy Rosary educational building, dormitory for women, gymnasium, pavilion, and rectory would be razed, while leaving the worship building intact. The Texas Historical Commission (THC) in 2017 established a historical marker.
 In 2009 the archdiocese announced that it would raze Sacred Heart's educational building, gymnasium, and meeting rooms, leaving the worship building and rectory intact.
 Mary, Star of the Sea (Jamaica Beach)
 Our Lady by the Sea Chapel (Crystal Beach in the Bolivar Peninsula) - Intended to serve all Catholics of the peninsula, it was built on the site of the former St. Therese of Lisieux Mission, which Hurricane Ike damaged in 2008. The design was intended to repel effects from hurricanes. John Nova Lomax of the Houston Press wrote that "Our Lady effectively consolidates [St Therese of Lisieux] and Port Bolivar's Our Mother of Mercy". It was dedicated in 2010. Between Hurricane Ike and the opening of Our Lady by the Sea, Bolivar residents attended church in Galveston or in Winnie. Residents opposed to the demolition of Our Mother of Mercy expressed a negative reception to the opening of Our Lady by the Sea.
 Mary Queen Church (Friendswood)
 Queen of Peace Church (La Marque)
 Our Lady of Lourdes Church (Hitchcock)
 Shrine of the True Cross Church (Dickinson)
 St. Mary Church (League City)
 St. Mary of the Miraculous Medal Church (Texas City)
 St. Mary, Star of the Sea Church (Freeport)

Grimes County
 Christ Our Light Church (Navasota)
 St. Joseph Mission (Stoneham)
 St. Mary Church (Plantersville)
 St. Stanislaus Church (Anderson)

Harris County

Houston city limits
 All Saints Church (Houston Heights)
 Annunciation Church (Downtown)
 Ascension Chinese Mission (Alief super neighborhood) - It originated from a Chinese worship service that was established in the 1970s. The parish was created in 1988, initially operating out of a commercial center in the southwest Houston Chinatown area. It relocated to its current site in Spring 1991.
Assumption Church (north Houston)
Blessed Sacrament Church (East End)
Catholic Charismatic Center (East Downtown)
 Christ, The Incarnate Word Church (Alief super neighborhood) - It opened in 1998. It is one of five Vietnamese Catholic churches in the Houston area.
Christ the King Church (East Norhill)
 Co-Cathedral of the Sacred Heart (Downtown)
Corpus Christi Church (Westwood subdivision)
 Holy Cross Chapel (Downtown)
 Holy Ghost Church - It is on a  property, in the Gulfton area, one city block from Bellaire. The church building is in the shape of a "T". In 2006 it had about 4,000 regular parishioners. It give church services in both English and Spanish, with three masses per language each week. In 2006 a man who was bilingual in English and Spanish was the pastor. A group of volunteers created stained glass windows that were put in the church by 2008; the project began circa 1983.
 Holy Name Church (Near Northside, Northside District)
 Holy Rosary Church (Midtown) - The parish was established in 1913. In 1933 it constructed a parish hall. Pastor Joseph Konkel described that parish hall as the city's "only major construction project" due to the effects of the Great Depression on the city's economy. Post-1970s suburbanization had resulted in a decline in parish membership. Circa 1994 the church bought , which it used for educational programs, in an office complex. Parish membership increased due to gentrification of Midtown post-1994. By 2004 a  expansion was under way. In 2004 about 25% of the congregation was ethnic Vietnamese, and there are two masses per week in the Vietnamese language. Therefore it is one of five Vietnamese Catholic churches in the Houston area.
 Immaculate Conception Church (Magnolia Park) - Initially the church catered to Anglo whites, with Mexican Americans being forced to go to the back of the church. This was the impetus for establishing Our Lady of Guadalupe.
 Immaculate Heart of Mary Church (Magnolia Park)
 La Divina Providencia (Port Houston)
 Notre Dame Church (Alief) - It opened in 1969 with 173 families and a  church structure with room for 750. From 1970 to 1975 the Continuing Christian Education and parish hall structures were built. By 2008 the church had 2,600 families. It previously used a  sancturary. The South Continuing Christian Education structure previously on the site was to be razed. Its site has  of land.
 Our Lady of Czestochowa Roman Catholic Parish (Spring Branch) - A Polish American church, it was established in the 1980s. At the time Polish immigrants who resisted Communist rule in that country arrived in Houston.
 Our Lady of Guadalupe Catholic Church (Second Ward, East End)
 Our Lady of Lourdes Church (northwest Houston - It is one of five Vietnamese Catholic churches in the Houston area.
 Our Lady of Sorrows Church (Northeast Houston)
 Our Lady of St. John Church (Northeast Houston)
 Our Lady Star of the Sea Church (East Houston)
 Our Mother of Mercy Catholic Church (Fifth Ward)
 Our Lady of Mount Carmel Church (Southeast Houston)
 Prince of Peace Catholic Community (Houston)
 Queen of Peace Church (East End)
 Resurrection Church (Denver Harbor)
 St. Albert of Trapani Church (Brays Oaks)
 St. Alphonsus Church (Manchester)
 St. Ambrose Church (Oak Forest)
 St. Andrew Kim Catholic Church (Spring Branch). Named after Andrew Kim Taegon, it serves ethnic Koreans and Korean speakers in the archdiocese.
 St. Anne Church - The church is in proximity to River Oaks and Neartown/Montrose. It holds an annual event, established in 1948, called "Fall Fiesta".
 St. Anne De Beaupre Church (Sunset Heights Extension No. 2) The third black church, St. Anne de Beaupre, named after the Basilica of Sainte-Anne-de-Beaupré in Sainte-Anne-de-Beaupré, Quebec, Canada, opened in 1938. It was initially a dependency of Our Mother of Mercy. The naming after a Francophone Canadian site reflects the Louisiana Creole culture. It is in proximity to the Houston Heights, and to Independence Heights.
 St. Augustine Church (Southeast Houston)
 St. Benedict the Abbot Church (5 Corners District) - Established in June 1963, with Montgomery Elementary School being the initial church location. The groundbreaking of the permanent facility was on May 22, 1964.
 St. Bernadette Church (Clear Lake City)
 St. Catherine of Siena Church (Spring Branch)
 St. Charles Borromeo Church (Northside District)
 St. Christopher Church (Southeast Houston)
 St. Clare of Assisi Church (Clear Lake City) - Its  addition opened in 2015. Inside are a  narthex as well as meeting rooms.
 St. Cyril of Alexandria Church (Westchase)
 St. Frances Cabrini Church (Southeast Houston)
 St. Francis de Sales Church (Sharpstown Country Club Terrace Section 2) -  it had 2,700 families.
 St. Francis of Assisi Church (Kashmere Gardens)
 St. Francis Xavier Church (Southern Houston)
 St. Gregory the Great Church (Northeast Houston)
 St. Jerome Church (Spring Branch)
 St. John Vianney Church (Memorial)
 St. Joseph - St. Stephen Church (Sixth Ward) - It formed by the 2016 merger of St. Joseph and St. Stephen parishes. The archdiocese first announced the merger proposal in 2014.
 St. Justin Martyr Church (Alief)
 St. Martha Church Faith Formation Office and Catholic School (Kingwood) - Previously the main campus was in Kingwood; it is currently in Porter.
 St. Mary of the Purification Church (Third Ward) - It was established on April 5, 1929.
 St. Michael Church (West Houston) - It is in proximity to the Houston Galleria.
 St. Monica Church (Acres Homes) - The parish was established in 1964, and it originated from a mission established in the 1940s.
 St. Nicholas Church (East Downtown) - It is Houston's oldest black Catholic church. It is/was considered to be in the Third Ward. By 2012 the church held Swahili masses due to it gaining African immigrant parishioners. In particular it has a group of Cameroonians in the congregation served by the Assumption Cameroonian Catholic Community, so it has services each month tailored to that group. In 2013 the church had experienced multiple instances of copper theft.
 St. Patrick Church (Northside District)
 St. Peter the Apostle Church (Third Ward) - Established in 1941.
 St. Peter Claver Church (Settegast) - It was the first church in the archdiocese with an African-American pastor. It became a parish in November 1964.
 St. Philip Neri Church (southern Houston) - It is in proximity to Sunnyside and South Park.
 St. Philip of Jesus Church (northeast Houston)
 St. Raphael the Archangel Church (west Houston)
 St. Rose of Lima Church (Garden Oaks)
 St. Theresa Church (in Memorial Park) - Started in Memorial Elementary School, with the first worship service April 14, 1946. Groundbreaking of the permanent building was on April 20, 1947.
 St. Thomas More Church (Southwest Houston)
 St. Vincent de Paul Church - It was established in 1939 with the parish church being built from the following year. It is in proximity to West University Place. 
 Vietnamese Martyrs Church - It is one of five Vietnamese Catholic churches in the Houston area.

NOTE: St. Mark the Evangelist Church is in the city of Houston but is in Fort Bend County instead of Harris County.

Cities other than Houston
 Our Lady of Fatima Church (Galena Park)
 Our Lady of Grace Church (South Houston)
 Our Lady of Guadalupe Church (Baytown)
 St. Anne Church (Tomball)
 St. Bartholomew the Apostle Catholic Church (City of Katy) - The church has regular worship services in English, Spanish, and Vietnamese.
 St. Cecilia Church (Hedwig Village, Houston postal address) - Previously St. Theresa church served the Memorial Villages area. St. Cecilia was established by Bishop Nold on July 1, 1956.
 St. Hyacinth Church (Deer Park)
 St. John the Evangelist Church (Baytown)
 St. Joseph Church (Baytown)
 St. Juan Diego Church (Pasadena)
 St. Luke the Evangelist Church Cenacle Learning Center (CLC) (Pearland) (other parts of Pearland with churches are in Brazoria County)
 St. Mary Church (La Porte)
 St. Mary Magdalene Church (Humble) - By 1911 the Church of the Immaculate Conception established the St. Mary’s Mission in Humble; it received a permanent building in 1915. At one point the church moved to its current location.
 St. Paul the Apostle Church (Nassau Bay)
 St. Pius V Church (Pasadena)

Unincorporated areas
 Christ The Good Shepherd Church (Spring postal address) - It was established on April 1, 1978.
 Christ the Redeemer Church (Houston postal address) - It was established after 1980, and originally used Millsap Elementary School as its worship center. The permanent building was dedicated on August 19, 1984, on the same year construction ended. - It was established in 1980. In 2005 Tara Dooley of the Houston Chronicle stated that it had "A swelling membership".
 Epiphany of the Lord Church (Greater Katy) - It opened in 1981. In 1984 a Molotov cocktail damaged the church building. The church building received several additions. Jack Dinkins was the pastor in 2010.  Tom Lam is the pastor of Epiphany of the Lord.
 Holy Family Church (McNair)
 Our Lady of Lavang Church (Houston postal address) - It is one of five Vietnamese Catholic churches in the Houston area.
 Regina Caeli Parish (Houston postal address) - Established on August 15, 2013, it uses a traditional Latin language worship style from the period before Vatican II. The church's name is "Queen of Heaven" in English.
 Sacred Heart Church (Crosby)
 St. Andrew Church (Channelview)
 St. Dominic Church (Houston postal address)
The Archdiocese of Galveston-Houston bought the site in March 1999. The church's 100-seat  sanctuary and  Formation Center were scheduled to be completed in early March 2004 for a total of $5.8 million. Other buildings were to be erected at a later time. Prior to the opening of the permanent facilities, the church was housed in Katy ISD buildings.  about 600 families were registered at St. Edith Stein. By 2006 there were 1,400 families.
 St. Edward Church (Spring postal address)
 St. Elizabeth Ann Seton Church (Houston postal address)
 St. Ignatius Loyola Church (Spring postal address) - It was established in 1985.
 St. James the Apostle Church (Spring census-designated place)
 St. John Neumann Church (Houston postal address)
 St. Jude Thaddeus Church (Highlands)
 St. Leo the Great Church (Houston postal address)
 St. Luke the Evangelist Church (Houston postal address) The main campus is in an unincorporated area while the Cenacle Learning Center (CLC) is in Pearland.
 St. Martin de Porres Church (Barrett)
 St. Matthew the Evangelist Church (Houston postal address)
 St. Maximilian Kolbe Church (Houston postal address) - In July 1983 the church was established, and it initially used Post Elementary School in Jersey Village before moving to Emmott Elementary School by Summer 1985. The permanent church was built from November 1986 with dedication on November 1, 1987.
 St. Philip the Apostle Church (Huffman)

Montgomery County
 Sacred Heart Church (Conroe)
 St. Anthony of Padua Church (The Woodlands) -  It had 3,020 families in its congregation in 2006, and 5,700 families in its congregation in 2013. It operates St. Anthony of Padua Catholic School.
 St. John of the Cross Church (New Caney)
 St. Martha Church (Porter) - It was established on February 25, 1979 with it initially being in Elm Grove Elementary School in Kingwood. The permanent building was built, with completion in September 1980 and with dedication the following month. Construction on the current building in Porter began in 2009, and it was dedicated on August 12, 2011. The faith formation office remains in Kingwood, as does the K-8 parish school.
 St. Matthias the Apostle Church (Magnolia)
 Saints Simon and Jude Church (The Woodlands) - The first Catholic church in The Woodlands, it was established circa 1980, with its 400 parishioners initially meeting at Knox Junior High School before moving into its permanent building in 1981.  it had 3,800 families in its congregation.

San Jacinto County
 St. Stephen the Martyr Mission (Point Blank)

Walker County
 St. Joseph Church (New Waverly)
 St. Thomas the Apostle Church (Huntsville)

Waller County
 Sacred Heart Church (unincorporated area next to Pattison)
 St. Katharine Drexel Church (Hempstead)

Former churches
 Our Mother of Mercy Church (Port Bolivar, Bolivar Peninsula) - It was established circa 1950. Lomax wrote that the church "was the site of many marriages and funerals for generations of Bolivarians." It closed after Hurricane Ike in 2008. At the end of its life, its congregation numbered 75, although in summer months vacationers also attended church there. Lomax described it as "a dowdy, declining parish". Archbishop Joseph Fiorenza had it razed, despite the lack of damage from the hurricane. The archdiocese argued that keeping the structure would cause further expenses, and that future weather issues could damage the building. Lomax wrote "the archdiocese viewed the church as old and in the way". He added that former members of the congregation had a negative reception to the demolition and the consolidation to the Our Lady By The Sea site at Crystal Beach.
 Reina de la Paz (Galveston) This was a mission of St. Patrick Church. In 2009 the Archdiocese announced that it will sell the site.
 St. Joseph's Church (Galveston) - Closed in 1968
 St. Peter the Apostle Church (Galveston) - In 2009 the archdiocese announced that it will sell the land, with the rectory remaining intact but the other buildings being razed.
 St. Theresa of Liseaux Mission (Crystal Beach) - It was built in 1994. It sustained damage during Hurricane Ike in 2008, and due to the damage the archdiocese had it razed. Our Lady By The Sea was built on its site.
 St. Stephen Church (First Ward, Houston) - The church, which had a congregation with many Mexican immigrants, occupied what Lisa Gray of the Houston Chronicle referred to as "a modest church building" and was in an area experiencing gentrification. It closed in 2016 when it was merged with St. Joseph Church. In 2018, and 2019, there were protests advocating that the archdiocese reopen the church. The leadership of the Catholic church overruled the archdiocese and ordered the church to reopen, but as of 2019 no such reopening has yet occurred.

References

Churches
 
 
Galveston-Houston
Churches

Churches